Salih Durkalić (born 24 July 1951 in Yugoslavia) is a former Croatian football player.

Club career
In his career, he played for NK Rijeka, K.V. Kortrijk, FC Sochaux-Montbéliard, FC Mulhouse and Le Havre AC.

References

 

1951 births
Living people
Association football forwards
Yugoslav footballers
HNK Rijeka players
K.V. Kortrijk players
FC Sochaux-Montbéliard players
FC Mulhouse players
Le Havre AC players
Yugoslav First League players
Ligue 2 players
Ligue 1 players
Yugoslav expatriate footballers
Expatriate footballers in Belgium
Yugoslav expatriate sportspeople in Belgium
Expatriate footballers in France
Yugoslav expatriate sportspeople in France